Richard Weber may refer to:

 Richard Weber (explorer) (born 1959), Canadian Arctic and polar adventurer
 Richard Weber (mathematician) (born 1953), English mathematician
 Richard Weber (poet) (born 1932), Irish poet
 Richard Weber (public servant), former US IRS-CI Chief

See also
 Richard Webber (disambiguation)
 Dick Weber (1929–2005), American ten-pin bowler